Tintor is a Serbian surname. Notable people with the surname include:

 George Tintor (1957–2021), Canadian rower
 Miloš Tintor (born 1986), Serbian footballer
 Vladimir Tintor (disambiguation), multiple people

Serbian surnames